The Dance of Death (French: La danse de mort, Italian: La prigioniera dell'isola) is a 1948 French-Italian drama film directed by Marcel Cravenne and starring Erich von Stroheim, Denise Vernac and Palau. It is based on August Strindberg's The Dance of Death.

The film's sets were designed by Georges Wakhévitch.

Plot
An egocentric artillery Captain and his venomous wife engage in savage unremitting battles in their isolated island fortress off the coast of Sweden at the turn of the century. Alice, a former actress who sacrificed her career for secluded military life with Edgar, reveals on the occasion of their 25th wedding anniversary, the veritable hell their marriage has been. Edgar, an aging schizophrenic who refuses to acknowledge his severe illness, struggles to sustain his ferocity and arrogance with an animal disregard for other people. Sensing that Alice, together with her cousin and would-be lover, Kurt, may ally against him, retaliates with vicious force. Alice lures Kurt into the illusion of sharing a passionate assignation and recruits him in a plot to destroy Edgar.

Cast
 Erich von Stroheim as Edgar  
 Denise Vernac as Théa  
 Palau as Le sergent / Il sergente  
 Massimo Serato as Stéphane / Stefano  
 Paul Oettly as Le général / Il generale 
 Marie Olivier 
 Henri Pons as Le timonier / Il timoniere  
 Roberto Villa 
 Galeazzo Benti 
 Margo Lion as Mathilde - la servante  
 Jean Servais as Kurt  
 María Denis as Rita 
 Roberto Bertea

References

Bibliography 
 Lennig, Arthur . Stroheim. University Press of Kentucky, 2004.

External links 
 

French historical drama films
Italian historical drama films
1940s historical drama films
1948 films
1940s French-language films
Films based on works by August Strindberg
Films directed by Marcel Cravenne
Films set in the 1900s
Films set on islands
Gaumont Film Company films
French black-and-white films
Italian black-and-white films
1948 drama films
1940s French films
1940s Italian films